Deh Now-e Shur (also Romanized as Deh Now-e Shūr; also known as Dehnow-e Sarbor) is a village in Eshqabad Rural District, Miyan Jolgeh District, Nishapur County, Razavi Khorasan Province, Iran. At the 2006 census, its population was 127, in 35 families.

References 

Populated places in Nishapur County